Curious George is the main character of a series of children's books.

Curious George may also refer to:

Based on the book series 
Curious George (book), the first Curious George book.
Curious George (franchise)
Curious George (film)
Curious George (TV series), television series shown from 2006
Curious George (1980s TV series), short-form television series from the '80s
Curious George (video game)

Inspired by the monkey 
Comedian George Carlin referring to himself as Curious George in his Complaints and Grievances album
Curious George Brigade, an anarchist collective in New York City